Gambaro is an Australian hospitality group headquartered in Brisbane, Queensland founded in 1953. The group was passed from original founder Giovanbaptista Gambaro to son Michael and Domenico, who opened Gambaro seafood restaurant in 1974. It is the oldest established restaurant in Brisbane. Currently the Gambaro Group comprises businesses including the Gambaro Restaurant, Black Hide Steakhouse, Persone and the Gambaro Hotel, MG Bar and Function Centre.

History 
The very first Gambaro establishment opened in Brisbane on Caxton Street in Petrie Terrace in 1953. It started as a family business by Giovanbaptista Gambaro, an Italian immigrant who moved to Australia in 1938 and settled in North Queensland. In the late 1940s, his family also migrated and started working with him. In 1953, Giovanbaptista started a fish and chips shop along with his sons Domenico and Michael on Caxton Street in Petrie Terrace and a seafood wholesale site in South Brisbane. In 1974, Michael co-founded Gambaro Seafood Restaurant with his brother Domeico which became a fine dining restaurant in Brisbane, as well as a network of wholesale and retail seafood export business. Gambaro restaurant is now run by third generation sons John, Frank and Donny Gambaro. In 2013, the family added to their property portfolio with Black Hide Steakhouse across the road and in 2014, a boutique hotel. They also included a bar and function centre for hosting events and conference.

Services

Gambaro Seafood Restaurant 
Established in 1974, the Gambaro Seafood Restaurant is noted for mud crab,  lobster and barramundi dish invented by Michael Gambaro. In 2012, the restaurant was featured at the Caterer of the Year awards and named the best seasfood restaurant is Brisbane.

Gambaro Hotel Brisbane 
On 1 May 2014 Gambaro Hotel Brisbane opened on Caxton Street alongside the Gambaro Seafood Restaurant and Function Centre. The 68-room luxury boutique hotel is designed by Hirsch Bedner Associates and offers nine different room types and  state-of-the-art in-room technology. It is the only five-star luxury accommodation available in the area of Lang Park and Paddington. The third level of the hotel has a Sunset Lounge terrace that is available for dinners. In addition to this, all rooms have the Appelles Black Label amenities to the Gambaro Hotel. The hotel received QHA Awards for Excellence as the "Best New Accommodation Hotel in Queensland" in October 2014. In July 2022, it was sold to the Australian Rugby League Commission.

Black Hide Steakhouse 
The Gambaro owners opened a new restaurant on the Caxton Street in June 2013. Initially it launched as Cut Steakhouse & Tapas and soon changed its title to Black Hide Steakhouse. Chef is Lukas McEwan who previously worked at Rockpool Sydney and the menu includes Angus and Wagyu beef, as well as organic steak from Stanbroke Beef. The Steakhouse was named Restaurant of the Year at the 2014 Restaurant & Catering Awards for Excellence, held at the Brisbane Convention and Exhibition Centre. It also received Queensland's Best Steak Restaurant award in a row in 2014 and 2015 at the Queensland Restaurant & Catering Awards for Excellence. It received national recognition winning Australia’s Best Steak Restaurant at National Restaurant & Catering Awards for Excellence 2014.

References 

Hotels in Queensland
1953 establishments in Australia
Pubs in Brisbane
Companies based in Brisbane
Restaurants in Queensland